Tsamis is a Greek surname. Notable people with that surname include:
Angelos Tsamis (born 1981), Greek professional basketball player
George Tsamis (born 1967), retired Major League Baseball pitcher, now a professional baseball team manager
Betty Tsamis

Greek-language surnames
Surnames